DVBS may refer to

 Developing Virtue Secondary School,  a Buddhist school in Talmage, California
 DVB-S, the abbreviation for "Digital Video Broadcasting — Satellite"